Francesco Pannofino (born 14 November 1958) is an Italian actor and voice actor.

Biography
Born in Pieve di Teco, Pannofino's parents originated from Locorotondo. Sometime after 1972, he and his family moved to Rome. He began his career in the 1980s. As an actor, Pannofino appeared in many films and television programs. These include Giovanni Falcone – L'uomo che sfidò Cosa Nostra, in which he portrayed real life gangster Tommaso Buscetta. He also appeared in Night Bus starring Giovanna Mezzogiorno and Valerio Mastandrea as well as the TV film Imperium: Pompeii.

As a voice actor, Pannofino dubbed characters into the Italian language. He is the official voice actor of George Clooney and Denzel Washington. Other actors he often or occasionally dubs includes Mickey Rourke, Ray Winstone, Jean-Claude Van Damme, Antonio Banderas, Tom Hanks, Kurt Russell, Dan Aykroyd, Philip Seymour Hoffman, Michael Madsen, Kiefer Sutherland and Kevin Spacey. Pannofino performed the Italian voices of characters such as Rubeus Hagrid in the Harry Potter franchise, Lrrr in Futurama, Gil Grissom in CSI: Crime Scene Investigation, Budd in Kill Bill: Volume 1 and Kill Bill: Volume 2 and many more.

In 1978, Pannofino was a witness of the kidnapping of Aldo Moro. At that time, he was waiting for a bus to take him to university so that he can undergo an algebra exam.

Personal life
Pannofino is married to voice actress Emanuela Rossi, whom he has made several collaborations with. Together, they have one son, Andrea. They briefly divorced in 2006 but they eventually remarried in 2011. Pannofino's brother Lino is a dialogue writer.

Filmography

Cinema
Croce e delizia (1995)
That's Life (1998)
Free the Fish (2000)
Fatti della banda della Magliana (2005)
Night Bus (2007)
Lessons in Chocolate (2007)
This Night Is Still Ours (2008)
Pinocchio (2008)
L'uomo fiammifero (2009)
Different from Whom? (2009)
Just Married (2009)
Me and Marilyn (2009)
Scontro di civiltà per un ascensore a Piazza Vittorio (2010)
Coincidenze (2010)
Men vs. Women (2010)
Boris: The Film (2011)
Faccio un salto all'Avana (2011)
Una notte da paura (2012) – TV Film
Poker Generation (2012)
Workers - Pronti a tutto (2012)
Operazione vacanze (2012)
L'arbitro (2013)
Il pretore (2014)
Ogni maledetto Natale (2014)
Patria (2014)
Le frise ignoranti (2015)
Burning Love (2015)
Assolo (2016)
My Father Jack (2016)
The Match (2019)

Dubbing roles

Animation
Papi in Beverly Hills Chihuahua
Papi in Beverly Hills Chihuahua 2
Papi in Beverly Hills Chihuahua 3: Viva la Fiesta!
Itchiford "Itchy" Dachshund in All Dogs Go to Heaven 2
General Von Talon in Valiant
Mr. Fox in Fantastic Mr. Fox
Lrrr in Futurama (seasons 1–5)
Chief Ted Grizzly in Hoodwinked!
Lord Rothbart in The Swan Princess
Lord Rothbart in The Swan Princess: The Mystery of the Enchanted Kingdom
Conductor / Santa Claus / Hobo Ghost / Narrator in The Polar Express
Tiger in An American Tail: Fievel Goes West
Daffy Duck in Who Framed Roger Rabbit
Grug Crood in The Croods
Captain Gutt in Ice Age: Continental Drift
Dr. Glickenstein in Igor
Sid in Flushed Away
Featherstone in Gnomeo & Juliet
Master Storming Ox in Kung Fu Panda 2
Sam in Cats & Dogs
Grimroth "Grim" Razz in Ratchet & Clank
Bomb in The Angry Birds Movie
Bomb in The Angry Birds Movie 2
The Red Guy in Cow and Chicken
The Red Guy in I Am Weasel
Grundel in Thumbelina
George Clooney in Team America: World Police
Pepe the King Prawn in Muppets from Space
Pinky in Rock-a-Doodle
Hanover Fiste / Dr. Anrak in Heavy Metal (1996 redub)
Double Dan in Ralph Breaks the Internet
Mr. Mulch in Wallace & Gromit: The Curse of the Were-Rabbit
Cookie Monster in The Adventures of Elmo in Grouchland
Mayor in Boo, Zino & the Snurks
Nicholas St. North in Rise of the Guardians
Skunky Skunk in Bonkers
Barney the Encyclocentipedia in ChalkZone

Live action
Jack Taylor in One Fine Day
Thomas Devoe in The Peacemaker
Jack Foley in Out of Sight
Archie Gates in Three Kings
Ulysses Everett McGill in O Brother, Where Art Thou?
Billy Tyne in The Perfect Storm
Devlin in Spy Kids
Devlin in Spy Kids 3-D: Game Over
Danny Ocean in Ocean's Eleven
Danny Ocean in Ocean's Twelve
Danny Ocean in Ocean's Thirteen
Chris Kelvin in Solaris
Jim Byrd in Confessions of a Dangerous Mind
Miles Massey in Intolerable Cruelty
Bob Barnes in Syriana
Jacob Geismer in The Good German
Michael Clayton in Michael Clayton
Jimmy "Dodge" Connelly in Leatherheads
Harry Pfarrer in Burn After Reading
Lyn Cassady in The Men Who Stare at Goats
Ryan Bingham in Up in the Air
Jack / Edward in The American
Mike Morris in The Ides of March
Matt King in The Descendants
Matt Kowalski in Gravity
Frank Stokes in The Monuments Men
Frank Walker in Tomorrowland
Baird Whitlock in Hail, Caesar!
Lee Gates in Money Monster
Lieutenant Scheisskopf in Catch-22
Steve Biko in Cry Freedom
Napoleon Stone in Heart Condition
Bleek Gilliam in Mo' Better Blues
Malcolm X in Malcolm X
Gray Grantham in The Pelican Brief
Joe Miller in Philadelphia
Ezekiel "Easy" Rawlins in Devil in a Blue Dress
Lincoln Rhyme in The Bone Collector
John Quincy Archibald in John Q.
John Hobbes in Fallen
Herman Boone in Remember the Titans
Alonzo Harris in Training Day
Matthias Lee Whitlock in Out of Time
John W. Creasy in Man on Fire
Bennett Marco in The Manchurian Candidate
Keith Frazier in Inside Man
Douglas Carlin in Déjà Vu
Walter Garber in The Taking of Pelham 123
Eli in The Book of Eli
Frank Barnes in Unstoppable
Tobin Frost in Safe House
Whip Whitaker in Flight
Bobby Trench in 2 Guns
Robert McCall in The Equalizer
Robert McCall in The Equalizer 2
Sam Chisholm in The Magnificent Seven
Troy Maxson in Fences
Roman J. Israel in Roman J. Israel, Esq.
Forrest Gump in Forrest Gump
Florence Nightingale in Fall Time
Jan in Animal Factory
Robin Ramzinski in The Wrestler
Ed Moseby in Domino
Darrius Sayle in Stormbreaker
Ivan Vanko in Iron Man 2
Butch "Bullet" Stein in Bullet
Armand Degas in Killshot
King Hyperion in Immortals
Gil Grissom in CSI: Crime Scene Investigation
Budd in Kill Bill: Volume 1
Budd in Kill Bill: Volume 2
T.J. in My Boss's Daughter
Sonny Black in Donnie Brasco
Fred Flintstone in The Flintstones
Hound in Transformers: Age of Extinction
Hound in Transformers: The Last Knight
Frank in The Gambler
Rubeus Hagrid in Harry Potter and the Philosopher's Stone
Rubeus Hagrid in Harry Potter and the Chamber of Secrets
Rubeus Hagrid in Harry Potter and the Prisoner of Azkaban
Ruebus Hagrid in Harry Potter and the Goblet of Fire
Ruebus Hagrid in Harry Potter and the Order of the Phoenix
Ruebus Hagrid in Harry Potter and the Half-Blood Prince
Ruebus Hagrid in Harry Potter and the Deathly Hallows – Part 1
Ruebus Hagrid in Harry Potter and the Deathly Hallows – Part 2
 Stephen McCaffrey / Dennis McCaffrey in Backdraft
Wyatt Earp in Tombstone
Jack O'Neill in Stargate
David Grant in Executive Decision
Michael Zane in 3000 Miles to Graceland
Curtis McCabe in Vanilla Sky
Captain Ives in Interstate 60
Herb Brooks in Miracle
Ben Crane in Dreamer
Steve Stronghold in Sky High
Mike McKay in Death Proof
John Ruth in The Hateful Eight
Jimmy Harrell in Deepwater Horizon
Randy Miller / Narrator in Once Upon a Time in Hollywood
Norman Osborn / Green Goblin in Spider-Man
Norman Osborn / Green Goblin in Spider-Man 2
Norman Osborn / Green Goblin in Spider-Man 3
Governor Lewis in Evolution
Frank Grillo in Earth vs. the Spider
Tom Everett in Caddyshack II
Jack Lambert in Getting Away with Murder
Chris Magruder in The Curse of the Jade Scorpion
Max Beasley in Unconditional Love
Joseph Keats in 50 First Dates
Vic Frohmeyer in Christmas with the Kranks
Seymour Heller in Behind the Candelabra
Emcee in Pixels
Long John Silver in Muppet Treasure Island
John Doe in Seven
Rufus Buckley in A Time to Kill
Jim Williams in Midnight in the Garden of Good and Evil
Chris Sabian in The Negotiator
Michael Lynch in Ordinary Decent Criminal
Kevin Spacey in Austin Powers in Goldmember
Gal Dove in Sexy Beast
Bruno Fella in Breaking and Entering
Beowulf in Beowulf
George "Mac" McHale in Indiana Jones and the Kingdom of the Crystal Skull
Tubal-cain in Noah
Stanley in The Gunman
Vince in The Fast and the Furious
Vince in Fast Five
Roman Pearce in 2 Fast 2 Furious
Xander Cage in XXX
Xander Cage in XXX: Return of Xander Cage
George Deckart in XXX: State of the Union
Luc Deveraux in Universal Soldier
Luc Deveraux in Universal Soldier: The Return
Sam Gillen in Nowhere to Run
Max Walker in Timecop
Colonel Guile in Street Fighter
Christopher Dubois in The Quest
Alain Moreau / Mikhail Suverov in Maximum Risk
Jack Paul Quinn in Double Team
Sam Keenan in Second in Command
Xander in Enemies Closer
Mark Hoffman in Saw IV
Mark Hoffman in Saw V
Mark Hoffman in Saw VI
Mark Hoffman in Saw 3D
Freddy Lounds in Red Dragon
Dean Trumbell in Punch-Drunk Love
Sandy Lyle in Along Came Polly
Owen Davian in Mission: Impossible III
Gust Avrakotos in Charlie Wilson's War
The Count in The Boat That Rocked
Lancaster Dodd in The Master
Günther Bachmann in A Most Wanted Man
Mickey Scarpato in God's Pocket
Carlos in Women on the Verge of a Nervous Breakdown
Marcos in Outrage!
Antonio in Miami Rhapsody
Armand in Interview with the Vampire
Art Dodge in Two Much
Miguel Bain in Assassins
Luis Antonio Vargas in Original Sin
Nicolas Bardo in Femme Fatale
Jeremiah Ecks in Ballistic: Ecks vs. Sever
Pierre Dulaine in Take the Lead
Alfonso Diaz in Bordertown
Bobby Rayburn in The Fan
Max Carlyle in One Night Stand
Mark J. Sheridan in U.S. Marshals
Eric Brooks / Blade in Blade
Eric Brooks / Blade in Blade II
Eric Brooks / Blade in Blade: Trinity
Jack Tuliver in 7 Seconds
Lorenz / Jason York in Chaos
James Jackson Dial in The Contractor
Neil Shaw in The Art of War II: Betrayal
Sean Miller in Patriot Games
Johnny Whitefeather in Imagine That
Jeremy Grey in Wedding Crashers
John Ammer in Click

Video games
Blackbeard in Assassin's Creed IV: Black Flag
Colonel Hathi in The Jungle Book Groove Party

References

External links

1958 births
Living people
People from the Province of Imperia
Sapienza University of Rome alumni
Italian male voice actors
Italian male film actors
Italian male stage actors
Italian male television actors
Italian male video game actors
Italian voice directors
20th-century Italian male actors
21st-century Italian male actors
People of Apulian descent